Leptobunus is a genus of harvestmen in the family Phalangiidae.

Species
 Leptobunus aureus J. C. Cokendolpher, 1984
 Leptobunus borealis Banks, 1899
 Leptobunus californicus Banks, 1893
 Leptobunus pallidus J. C. Cokendolpher, 1984
 Leptobunus parvulus (Banks, 1894)

References

Harvestmen
Taxa named by Nathan Banks
Harvestman genera